Pedro Marín (born 22 November 1961) is a Spanish pop singer, actor and TV performer.

Biography
Pedro Marín is one of the most emblematic Spanish pop singers. Since his beginnings during the 80s as the pop superstar to his mysterious retirement during years and his later comeback as a cult figure in art rock and electronic music during the 21st century. Tagged by the American Billboard Magazine as "the first avant-garde Spanish musician in history", Marín débuted on the popular music scene in Spain as a teen idol in the early 1980s with hits such as Que no and Aire. He was the first Spanish artist to work with synthesisers and electronic instruments being a reference to many bands which would come later. Being tagged by Billboard magazine as the first contemporary modern singer in Spanish music, he scored number one hits in Spain, Mexico, Portugal, Argentina, Colombia, Peru, top 5 hits in France and Germany, selling more than 2.5 million records. He then suddenly retired from the music business. During the 1990s, he worked in banking and finance in England and West Africa.

However, beginning in 2005, Marín returned to the public spotlight. He released a new full-length CD, Diamonds, in which he paid  tribute to Amanda Lear's disco-era oeuvre with electro cover versions of hits such as Queen of Chinatown, Follow Me, Fashion Pack, and Enigma.

With the success of Diamonds, Marín recorded a new album in 2007, Pulpo negro, which sold over 60 thousand copies in Spain. Unlike Diamonds, which was recorded in English, Pulpo negro was recorded in Spanish.

In 2009, Marín released one of his most critically acclaimed albums to date, I will glam, on which he composed all the songs. The album features collaborations with major artists from the Spanish rock and roll scene, such as Eric Jimenez from Los Planetas. Marín subsequently toured Spain for the first time in many years.

After this successful tour, Marín began work on a new album in Barcelona, produced by Stefano Maccarrone frontman of the avant garde electronic band Mendetz, which would be released in 2012.
A first single Te veo bailar, an advance from this forthcoming album Hombre mecanico ("The mechanical man") was released in June 2012 achieving more than 25,000 downloads in the first two weeks of its release (only in Spain). Hombre Mecanico the album released in Spain in 2013 and in Mexico in 2014.

He published the video Que No a remake of his 1979 classic. A theme "on being and feeling free. Be brave. Having and demanding to have rights. Support each others … and so many other things that would make this world a better place." The direction of the piece, by Marin himself.

In August 2014 the Mexican edition of Hombre Mecánico released with a track list slightly different from the Spanish album. Pedro visited Mexico for the first time since the 80s for a promotional tour.

Pedro Marín announced from México to CNN Internacional the upcoming release of the first short-film he has directed, Las viudas invisibles ("The invisible widows").  Filmed in India it deals with the problems of the widow collective in that country and culture.

In December 2014 participated in the festival that took place at the Estadio Azteca in Mexico City in front of 110,000 people, broadcast on the Televisa network on New Year's Eve.

Pedro Marín History

Marín, a handsome and charismatic young man in the early 80s, developed a passion for music that led him to become one of Spain's most popular voices. His fame spread throughout much of Europe and South America. The record sales were in the millions, yet by the decade's end the artist grew weary of the industry and the trappings of his lofty position in the business. At that point, he virtually vanished from sight. He returned to music in the 21st century with a fresh sense of creativity, a powerful new art-rock-dance sound and the relaxed yet confident attitude of someone who knows his way around life's challenges.

Marín started that type of electronic Synth Pop dance sound in Spain and overall in Latin music. It did not exist before, "I am very proud that my first single Que No (b/w Puente de Colores) was the first disco track sung in Spanish in Latin music history.”

Though Marín had successfully forged a new dance sound in Spain, the prospects for Spanish music in Europe were decidedly less promising. The singer's top ranking, self-titled LP (released in 1980) and follow-up hit, the jubilant and energized Aire, successfully moved Marin into the Spanish and European mainstream. Sales exceeded 2.5 million albums in just three years and included high chart positions in his homeland, Germany, Portugal, Mexico, Argentina, Colombia, Ecuador and Peru. His music was also embraced in Chile, Guatemala, Puerto Rico, Switzerland, Belgium and the Netherlands.

With his life radically changed by stardom, Pedro said he had to sacrifice the normal life most teenagers would have experienced. "I never had a regular youthful life. I couldn't have the life of a normal teenager that, but I've had other things in return – music, fame, money, and, most of all, the incredible and unique human experience of living my passion to an extreme."

However, though seemingly at the top of his game in the music business, Pedro was feeling the stress of the very career he was once so determined to have. He suddenly dropped out of sight, abandoning the business completely. "So, I ran away as far as I could. After studying in a university during the late 80s, I ended up living in Bali in the 90s."

In 2006, Marín made a decision to return to music, following a long career he had established in finance.
Emerging as a highly eclectic electro-synth-dance-pop artist, his return to the music scene was first heralded by the LP Diamonds, his interpretation of the songs of legendary singer Amanda Lear. "The Amanda thing was all about me playing in the studio beyond the takes I was recording for Pulpo Negro, my comeback album (of original material). When I returned in 2006, the music business was very badly damaged already. There was no interest whatsoever to release new material from somebody like me, who had not recorded an album in over 20 years. They would have possibly taken a revisited 80s hits album, but I hated the idea of doing one and refused. That just seemed a bit absurd to me. No record company wanted to release Pulpo Negro, so I created my own label (Mainman) to release it.  I managed to put together my first tour in decades with that album and it sold very well."

Discography

Álbumes 
 1980: Pedro Marín.
 1981: Rebelde.
 1982: Grandes éxitos y secretos (editado en Hispanoamérica).
 1992: Todas sus grabaciones 1979-1986 (Rama Lama, Blanco y Negro).
 2005: Diamonds (Discos Susurrando).
 2007: Pulpo negro (Mainman).
 2009: I Will Glam (Blanco y Negro, Mainman).
 2013: Hombre mecánico. (Mainman)
 2014: Hombre mecánico. (Edición México) (Mainman/Violet Friends Music).
 2015: Todas sus grabaciones en Hispavox. 1979-1986. (Warner Music Spain)
 2015: Slow. (Sus mejores canciones lentas '80-2014) (Mainman).
 2017: Los 80's (Sus mejores canciones) (Mainman)
 2017. Secret Songs (Mainman)
 2018 Antologia. Beauty & the Best (Mainman)

Singles

Videography 
 «Follow Me» (del álbum Diamonds).
 «Pulpo negro» (del álbum Pulpo negro). Directed by Joan Guasch.
 «Aire» Directed by Joan Guasch.
 «El día después» (del álbum I Will Glam). 
 «El influjo de la luna» (del álbum I Will Glam). Directed by Stefan Weinert.
 «Glam Song» (del álbum I Will Glam). Directed by Stefan Weinert.
 I Will Glam Tour Live.
 «Voy a ser yo» (del álbum I Will Glam).
 «Te veo bailar» (del álbum Hombre mecánico). Directed by Pedro Marin.
 «Sal».(del álbum Hombre mecánico). Directed by Pedro Marin.
 «Yo Sé» (del álbum Hombre mecánico).Directed by Pedro Marin.
 «Cómprame» (del álbum Hombre mecánico). Directed by Pedro Marin.
 «The Saint» (del álbum Hombre mecánico). Directed by Pedro Marin.
 «Tanto tiempo sin ti» (del álbum Hombre mecánico). Directed by Pedro Marin.
 «Sal 2.0» (del álbum Hombre mecánico). Directed by Pedro Marin.
 «Que No» (del álbum Hombre mecánico). Directed by Pedro Marin.
 «Cumbres de éxtasis» (del álbum Hombre mecánico). Directed by Pedro Marin.
 «Plastic Monsters» (del álbum Hombre mecánico). Directed by Pedro Marin.
 «El Pasajero» (del álbum Hombre mecánico edición México).
 «Yo Sé 2.0» (del álbum Hombre mecánico). Directed by Pedro Marin.
 "Bad Pizza Face" (del álbum Secret Songs) Directed by Ana Coello & Pedro Marín.
 "Baby, don´t let me down" (del álbum Secret songs). Directed by Pedro Marín.

Documentaries 
 The invisible widows, 2015, directed by and script by Pedro Marin

References

Sources

"Biografía," Official Pedro Marín website, accessed May 25, 2007.

External links
 Official Pedro Marín website 

1961 births
Living people
Spanish male singers
Spanish pop singers